WBBJ-TV (channel 7) is a television station in Jackson, Tennessee, United States, affiliated with ABC and CBS. Owned by Bahakel Communications, the station maintains studios on Muse Street in Jackson, and its transmitter is located on Potts Chapel Road in unincorporated eastern Madison County.

History
The station signed on March 6, 1955, as WDXI-TV, Jackson's first television station. It operated an analog signal on VHF channel 7, and was a CBS affiliate owned by Aaron Robinson along with WDXI radio (1310 AM). Cy Bahakel bought the station in 1966 and changed the call letters to the current WBBJ-TV in 1967 (as Robinson's estate held on to WDXI radio). Since then, WBBJ has had the longest ownership tenure of any station in Tennessee, surpassing stations in much larger markets in the state.

Soon after Bahakel took over, in January 1967, the station dropped CBS in favor of ABC (which WDXI-TV had carried as a secondary affiliation for some time beforehand); since then (and until the launch of WBBJ's CBS-affiliated subchannel), Jackson has received CBS programming from WREC-TV/WREG-TV in Memphis. Like many of the stations that operated in analog on channel 7, the station has used various versions of the circle 7 logo over the years; since 2003, WBBJ has used the original, ABC-trademarked version. Area viewers can also see ABC programming over-the-air in some areas from WATN-TV in Memphis, but that outlet is not carried by local cable providers.

WBBJ-DT3 (CBS) and WBBJ-DT4 (MeTV)
On January 1, 2012, WBBJ-DT3 became the area's CBS affiliate, bringing the network back to the market (and back to WBBJ, which carried the network until 1967). Outside of CBS programming, WBBJ-DT3 also carries syndicated programming and WBBJ newscasts (either simulcast with the main channel or shown exclusively on the subchannel). Additionally, between January 1, 2012, and September 2021, WBBJ-DT3 had served as a dual CBS/MeTV affiliate, offering programming from the MeTV service during select hours (on weekday afternoons and during overnight hours on weekends), in addition to the CBS affiliation, until MeTV programming was moved to a new fourth subchannel, which airs its full schedule uninterrupted. Prior to its CBS affiliation, WBBJ-DT3 served as a 24-hour live feed of a NOAA National Weather Service Doppler weather radar with audio from NOAA Weather Radio. As of September 2018, WBBJ-DT3 has been airing in 720p high definition (upgraded from its original 16:9 widescreen standard definition picture format), downconverted from the native resolution of 1080i for the CBS network. A direct-to-cable full 1080i high definition feed of WBBJ-DT3 is available on select cable providers.

Programming
Syndicated programming on the station includes The Drew Barrymore Show, Wheel of Fortune, Jeopardy!, and Live with Kelly and Ryan, among others.

News operation

On August 1, 2007, WBBJ debuted new graphics, logo, music, and an updated weather set. The station, which had been using Frank Gari's "Image News" music package since 1999, switched to "In-Sink" by Nashville-based company 615 Music. Also on this date, the weeknight 5 o'clock newscast dropped the Live at 5 branding and returned to ABC 7 Eyewitness News at 5 which is simulcast on local radio station WFHU (91.5 FM). The ninety-minute weekday morning show became Good Morning West Tennessee.

In addition to network and syndicated programming, there are local newscast offerings on WBBJ-DT3 through simulcasts with the main channel and broadcasts in new time slots. It offers local news weekdays at noon for thirty minutes as well as weeknights at 5:30 and 6:30 seen exclusively on the CBS subchannel. As a result, CBS Evening News airs weeknights at 6:00, which is a half-hour later than most affiliates in the Central Time Zone.

On January 23, 2013, the station debuted a brand new set that has a working newsroom behind the main anchor desk. Also, the new set shows the Circle 7 logo, but no longer features the ABC logo, since the station is affiliated with both ABC and CBS.

Notable former on-air staff
 Courtney Friel – news anchor
 Lew Jetton – reporter, weather, and sports anchor
 Anne Pressly – reporter (one month at WBBJ; now deceased)

Technical information

Subchannels
The station's digital signal is multiplexed:

WBBJ-TV shut down its analog signal, over VHF channel 7, on June 12, 2009, as part of the federally mandated transition from analog broadcasts to digital broadcasts.

References

External links
 WBBJTV.com – Official WBBJ-TV website
 MeTVJacksonTN.com – Official MeTV Jackson website

Bahakel Communications
Television channels and stations established in 1955
BBJ-TV
ABC network affiliates
MeTV affiliates
1955 establishments in Tennessee